This is a list of equipment used by the Royal Jordanian Army.

Weapons

Heavy equipment

Main battle tanks

Infantry carrier vehicle

Reconnaissance vehicles

Mine-Resistant Ambush Protected Vehicle

Artillery

Air defense

Ground radar and surveillance system

Utility vehicles

Anti-tank weapons

Logistic and engineering vehicles

References

Military equipment of Jordan
Jordan